Chak Bakhtawar,  Gujrat District, Punjab province, Pakistan. All of the people are Muslim and belong to the Mughal Family
  Sadkal and Bhagwal are nearby villages of Chak Bakhtawar a.k.a. Loharian.

Education 
There are two schools in Chak Bakhtawar:
 Government Elementary School Chak Bakhtawar (Boys)
 Government Primary School Chak Bakhtawar (Girls)

Sports
Village resident are keen to play cricket, volleyball and badminton. All three games are played and village has won many tournament and remarkable achievement

Muhammad Adrees, Arslan, Saqib Ali, Atif Saleem are famous athletes that are playing cricket in foreign countries

Notable people 
Among many others, Mr Altaf Hussain is one of the notable people from the village who got commission in Pakistan Navy, He has served as Commander North, Military Attache to the Oman Embassy for Pakistan and many other prominent positions. Mr Altaf was the commander of the submarine which carried the Prime Minister of Pakistan Shahid Khaqan Abassi to sail in Open Sea. Mr. Yasir Nazir has completed PhD in Chemistry and nowadays working for medicine molecular structure

References

Populated places in Gujrat District